

This is a list of the National Register of Historic Places listings in Washington County, Alabama.

This is intended to be a complete list of the properties and districts on the National Register of Historic Places in Washington County, Alabama, United States.  Latitude and longitude coordinates are provided for many National Register properties and districts; these locations may be seen together in a Google map.

There are 3 properties and districts listed on the National Register in the county.

|}

See also

 List of National Historic Landmarks in Alabama
 National Register of Historic Places listings in Alabama

References

 
Washington